Friedrich Wilhelm Paech (3 October 1861 – 29 December 1908) was an Australian politician who represented the South Australian House of Assembly multi-member seats of Light from 1899 to 1902 and Wooroora from 1902 to 1908, joining the Australasian National League in 1902.

References 

1861 births
1908 deaths
Members of the South Australian House of Assembly
19th-century Australian politicians